The 1970 Prize of Moscow News was the fifth edition of an international figure skating competition organized in Moscow, Soviet Union. It was held December 17–20, 1970. Medals were awarded in the disciplines of men's singles, ladies' singles, pair skating and ice dancing. Soviets swept the men's podium, with Sergei Chetverukhin defeating Sergey Volkov for the title. Marina Titova took the ladies' title ahead of skaters from East and West Germany. Lyudmila Smirnova / Andrei Suraikin won the pairs title ahead of Olympic champions Ludmila Belousova / Oleg Protopopov. Soviets also swept the ice dancing podium, led by World champions Lyudmila Pakhomova / Alexander Gorshkov.

Men

Ladies

Pairs

Ice dancing

References

Prize of Moscow News
1970 in Soviet sport
Prize of Moscow News
1970 in Moscow